Carlos Leopoldo Martínez Garrido (born 12 February 1989) is a Spanish footballer who plays for Lincoln Red Imps as a winger.

Club career
Born in Córdoba, Andalusia, Martínez started playing as a senior with Villanueva CF in the 2006–07 campaign, in Tercera División. He moved to Córdoba CF in January 2007, being assigned to the youth setup.

On 7 September 2011 Martínez played his first match as a professional, starting in a 1–0 away win against Real Murcia, for  the season's Copa del Rey. He spent the vast majority of his spell playing with the reserves also in the fourth level, however.

On 10 July 2012 Martínez joined Lucena CF, in Segunda División B. He continued to appear in the third level in the following campaigns, representing La Hoya Lorca CF and FC Cartagena.

On 3 August 2015 Martínez returned to La Hoya Lorca, and achieved promotion to Segunda División in 2017, as the club changed its name to Lorca FC. The following 19 January, he signed for Real Murcia after cutting ties with his previous club.

References

External links

1989 births
Living people
Footballers from Córdoba, Spain
Spanish footballers
Footballers from Andalusia
Association football wingers
Segunda División B players
Tercera División players
Córdoba CF B players
Córdoba CF players
Lucena CF players
Lorca FC players
FC Cartagena footballers
Real Murcia players
Recreativo de Huelva players